Anja Knippel (born 19 August 1974) is a retired German runner who specialised in the 800 metres. She was born in Schmalkalden.

At the 1999 World Indoor Championships she finished fourth in the 4 × 400 metres relay, together with teammates Anja Rücker, Ulrike Urbansky and Grit Breuer. At the 1999 World Championships she ran in the heats for the German team, helping to qualify for the final.

Her personal best time is 2:00.11 minutes, achieved in July 2002 in Cuxhaven.

References

External links 
 

1974 births
Living people
People from Schmalkalden
German female middle-distance runners
German national athletics champions
Sportspeople from Thuringia
World Athletics Championships athletes for Germany
World Athletics Indoor Championships medalists